Prince Louis Maria of Bourbon-Two Sicilies, Count of Trani (1 August 1838, Naples – 8 June 1886, Paris) was the eldest son of Ferdinand II of the Two Sicilies and his second wife Archduchess Maria Theresa of Austria.

Heir to the throne
Louis was a younger half-brother of Francis II of the Two Sicilies. He was second-in-line to the throne of the Two Sicilies since the time of his birth.

Their father died on 22 May 1859. Francis became King but had no children yet from his wife Maria Sophie of Bavaria. Louis became his heir presumptive. However the Two Sicilies were conquered by the Expedition of the Thousand under Giuseppe Garibaldi in 1861. Garibaldi served the Kingdom of Sardinia which was in the process of Italian unification.

Louis was still the heir of Francis as head of a deposed royal house. He retained this position for the rest of his life but predeceased Francis. Francis was eventually succeeded by their younger brother Prince Alfonso, Count of Caserta.

Marriage
On 5 June 1861, Louis married Duchess Mathilde Ludovika in Bavaria, the fourth daughter of Maximilian, Duke in Bavaria and Princess Ludovika of Bavaria. Two of Mathilde's sisters were Elisabeth of Bavaria, married to the Emperor of Austria, and Marie Sophie of Bavaria, wife of Louis's older half-brother Francis II of the Two Sicilies.  The marriage was unsuccessful almost from the start, and while Louis took refuge in alcohol, Mathilde spent most of her life traveling from place to place, often accompanied by her sisters.

Louis and Mathilde had a single daughter:

Princess Maria Teresa of Bourbon-Two Sicilies (15 January 1867, Zürich - 1 May 1909, Cannes).

Louis had one illegitimate son:

Charles of Duzzio (1869-1931).

Princess Maria Teresa married Prince Wilhelm of Hohenzollern-Sigmaringen on 27 June 1889 and later became the Princess of Hohenzollern when her father-in-law died in 1905. She had two sons and a daughter.

Death
Louis died of heart disease in Paris on 8 June 1886.

Ancestry

Sources

"The Book of Kings: A Royal Genealogy" by C. Arnold McNaughton.

External links

1838 births
1886 deaths
19th-century Neapolitan people
Princes of Bourbon-Two Sicilies
Counts of Trani
Italian Roman Catholics
Knights Cross of the Military Order of Maria Theresa
Royal reburials
Sons of kings
Non-inheriting heirs presumptive